Zecily Fung (born 1 October 2001) is an Australian badminton player who competes in international level events. She is a bronze medalist at the 2018 Oceania Badminton Championships in Hamilton, New Zealand, she has also represented Australia at the 2018 BWF World Junior Championships and the 2018 Summer Youth Olympics where she won the bronze medal in the mixed team event.

References

2001 births
Living people
People from Parramatta
Australian female badminton players
Badminton players at the 2018 Summer Youth Olympics